Malón (from the Mapudungun maleu, to inflict damage to the enemy) is the name given to plunder raids carried out by Mapuche warriors, who rode horses into Spanish, Chilean and Argentine territories from the 17th to the 19th centuries, as well as to their attacks on rival Mapuche factions. Historian Juan Ignacio Molina said the Mapuche considered the malón to be a means of obtaining justice: 

Leaders such as Lientur used the malón against European colonists: it consisted of a fast surprise attack by a number of mounted Mapuche warriors against the white (huinca) populations, ranches, settlements and fortifications in Chile and Argentina, with the aim of obtaining horses, cattle, provisions, and captives, often young women. The rapid attack without formal order did not give the targets time to organize a defense, and it left behind a devastated population unable to retaliate or pursue.

In Chile, the Spaniards responded with a system of fortifications known as La Frontera, garrisoned by a standing army that patrolled the border along the Biobío River. In Argentina, where the Mapuche in the 19th century ravaged the southern frontier, the government responded by building wooden outposts and occasionally fortresses, e.g. Fortaleza Protectora Argentina, as well as the Zanja de Alsina. This trench covered hundreds of kilometers across the Pampas to make incursions more difficult, as well as prevent the raiders from driving large numbers of cattle back across the frontier. Ultimately, the Argentine government invaded and conquered the Mapuche in their territory in the Conquest of the Desert of the late 1870s. Many Mapuche were killed and thousands more taken prisoner.

References

Sources 
  Juan Ignatius Molina, "The Geographical, Natural, and Civil History of Chili", Longman, Hurst, Rees, and Orme, London, 1809
  Commandante Manuel Prado (1863-1932): La guerra al Malón (The war against the Malón), 1907
 New edition: Prado, Manuel (2010) La guerra al Malón, Editorial Claridad SA, Buenos Aires, 

Military history of South America
History of the Captaincy General of Chile
Colonial Argentina
19th century in Chile
19th century in Argentina
Mapuche history